Pleasant Grove is an area located in the southeast portion of Dallas, Texas.

The Pleasant Grove area is bounded by Bruton Road to the North, Marvel Dr. on the south, Prairie Creek (the creek, not the road) on the east and the Trinity Forest on the west.

History 
The first settlers in the Pleasant Grove area in the 1840s included W. B. Elam, who held one of the original land grant, Richard Bruton, and Cornelius Cox. By 1875 a wooden building was used as a union church and school. An early teacher at one of the schools built in the 1880s was Don Lebow, who named the school Pleasant Grove after its location in a grove of cottonwood trees. The name was then applied to both the school and the community.

In 1900 Sam Street's map of Dallas County showed Pleasant Grove as a small community with a store. In 1916 the first brick schoolhouse was built.

In 1937 Pleasant Grove formed its own school district, which by the late 1940s had fourteen buildings.

Due to a post-World War II housing boom, the population grew from 120 to 3,500 between 1943 and 1952. By the late 1940s, Pleasant Grove had seven businesses, including a new bank. Businesses remained less important than the residential areas, but in 1952, Pleasant Grove Shopping Center, a major retail center, was built.

Pleasant Grove twice fought incorporation movements and remained unincorporated till June 1954 when Pleasant Grove was annexed by Dallas and the Pleasant Grove school district merged with the Dallas Independent School District.

In 1962 the Greater Pleasant Grove Chamber of Commerce was formed to promote business in the area. This organization was later expanded to cover surrounding communities, and became the Southeast Dallas Chamber of Commerce.

Education

Primary and secondary schools 
It is within the Dallas Independent School District (DISD).

DISD Middle schools that serve Pleasant Grove students:
S. S. Conner Junior High (1953 - 1963)
John B. Hood Junior High School (1955 - 2016)
Fred F. Florence Middle School (1963 - 2018)
Ann Richards Middle School in Pleasant Grove (2012 - Present)
Piedmont G.L.O.B.A.L. Academy (formerly John B. Hood Junior High) (Oct. 2016 - Present)
Young Men's Academy at Fred Florence (2018 - Present)

DISD High schools that serve or served Pleasant Grove students: 
Pleasant Grove High School (1937-1956)
W. W. Samuell High School (1956 - Present)
H. Grady Spruce High School (1963 - Present)
Skyline Center Magnet School (1971 - Present) 

The charter school operator Life's Beautiful Educational Centers Inc. (closed 1999) operated the school P.O.W.E.R. in Pleasant Grove.

Charter schools that serve Pleasant Grove students:

 A+ Academy Secondary School
 Inspired Vision Elementary School
 Inspired Vision Secondary School
 Golden Rule Pleasant Grove
 KIPP Pleasant Grove
 Nova Charter School
 Texas Can Academy
 Inspired Vision Intermediate
 Henry W. Longfellow Career Exploration Junior High School Academy
Cristo Rey Dallas College Prep work-study school (2015 - Present)

DISD operates the Pleasant Grove Stadium.

Colleges and universities
Pleasant Grove has a satellite Branch of Eastfield College of the Dallas County Community College District, in Pleasant Grove/Southeast Dallas at 802 N Buckner Boulevard.

Libraries 
The Pleasant Grove area is served by two public libraries.

1.Pleasant Grove Library Branch - Dallas Public Library
Address: 7310 Lake June Rd. ~ in Pleasant Grove/Southeast Dallas

2.Prairie Creek Library Branch - Dallas Public Library
Address: 9609 Lake June Rd., in Lake June/Southeast Dallas

Notable residents 

 Maceo Baston grew up in the Pleasant Grove area and attended Nancy Moseley Elementary School. He plays for the Toronto Raptors in the NBA.
 John Ford Coley — partner in musical duo with Dan Seals; hits include "I'd Really Love to See You Tonight"
 Larry Johnson, former NBA player grew up in the Pleasant Grove area and attended John B. Hood Middle School and Skyline High School.
 Michael Johnson also attended Skyline High School, gaining fame as a US Olympic Gold Medalist, setting numerous world records in Men's Sprinting.
 Joe Kendall — Adam federal judge (1992–2002)
 Russ Martin — Host of The Russ Martin Show, a radio program in Dallas.
 C.J. Miles of the Utah Jazz grew up in Pleasant Grove and attended Skyline Career Development Center. As a senior in high school he was named to the McDonald's all-high school team.
 Carl Mitcham — philosopher of technology and engineering, now at Colorado School of Mines
 Steve Ramsey — Punter/Quarterback New Orleans Saints 1970, Denver Broncos (1971–76)
 Lulu Roman — Former Hee Haw TV show personality.
 Dan Seals — country and pop musician

Further reading 
Pleasant Grove Historical Society ~ https://www.facebook.com/groups/156970454468433/
Pleasant Grove & Proud Group ~ https://www.facebook.com/PleasantGroveAndProudGroup
Miss Adas Pleasant Grove Community by Carothers, Meredith
Pleasant Grove, yesterday and today by Samuell (W.W.) High School. 1979 English 501-503 Class

References

Geography of Dallas